Sodium bromide is an inorganic compound with the formula NaBr.  It is a high-melting white, crystalline solid that resembles sodium chloride. It is a widely used source of the bromide ion and has many applications.

Synthesis, structure, reactions
NaBr crystallizes in the same cubic motif as NaCl, NaF and NaI.  The anhydrous salt crystallizes above 50.7 °C. Dihydrate salts (NaBr·2H2O) crystallize out of water solution below 50.7 °C.

NaBr is produced by treating sodium hydroxide with hydrogen bromide.

Sodium bromide can be used as a source of the chemical element bromine. This can be accomplished by treating an aqueous solution of NaBr with chlorine gas:
2 NaBr + Cl2 → Br2 + 2 NaCl

Applications
Sodium bromide is the most useful inorganic bromide in industry. It is also used as a catalyst in TEMPO-mediated oxidation reactions.

Medicine

Also known as Sedoneural, sodium bromide has been used as a hypnotic, anticonvulsant, and sedative in medicine, widely used as an anticonvulsant and a sedative in the late 19th and early 20th centuries. Its action is due to the bromide ion, and for this reason potassium bromide is equally effective. In 1975, bromides were removed from drugs in the U.S. such as Bromo-Seltzer due to toxicity.

Preparation of other bromine compounds
Sodium bromide is widely used for the preparation of other bromides in organic synthesis and other areas. It is a source of the bromide nucleophile to convert alkyl chlorides to more reactive alkyl bromides by the Finkelstein reaction:
NaBr + RCl → RBr + NaCl (R = alkyl)

Once a large need in photography, but now shrinking, the photosensitive salt silver bromide is prepared using NaBr.

Disinfectant
Sodium bromide is used in conjunction with chlorine as a disinfectant for hot tubs and swimming pools.

Petroleum industry
Because of its high solubility in water (943.2 g/L or 9.16 mol/L, at 25 °C) sodium bromide is used to prepare dense drilling fluids used in oil wells to compensate a possible overpressure arising in the fluid column and to counteract the associated trend to blow out. The presence of the sodium cation also causes the bentonite added to the drilling fluid to swell, while the high ionic strength induces bentonite flocculation.

Safety
NaBr has a very low toxicity with an oral  estimated at 3.5 g/kg for rats. However, this is a single-dose value. Bromide ion is a cumulative toxin with a relatively long half life (in excess of a week in humans): see potassium bromide.

References

External links

 Information about NaBr.
 Bromide Poisoning in Angola

Sodium compounds
Bromides
GABAA receptor positive allosteric modulators
Sedatives
Alkali metal bromides
Rock salt crystal structure